Humanes de Madrid is a town and municipality of Spain, part of the Community of Madrid. As of 2019, it has a population of 19,743 inhabitants.

Geography 

The municipality, with a total area of 1946 km2, features a largely flat relief, with the altitude ranging from the roughly 700 metres above sea level of the Cerro del Lomo to the roughly 644 metres of the Arroyo de las Arroyadas close to its confluence with the Arroyo de Valdenovillo del Prado, at the southeastern end of the municipality.

History 
Humanes is first mentioned in a 1141 document, when Alfonso VII donated the town to its first Lord. Humanes belonged to the Land of Toledo for the entire early modern period.

References 
Citations

Bibliography

External links
 The official site of the city 

Municipalities in the Community of Madrid